This is a summary of the electoral history of William Hague, who was leader of the Conservative Party from 19 June 1997 to 13 September 2001 and has been an MP since 1989.

Parliamentary Elections

1987 General Election, Wentworth

By Election 1989, Richmond (Yorks)

1992 General Election, Richmond (Yorks)

1997 General Election, Richmond (Yorks)

2001 General Election, Richmond (Yorks)

2005 General Election, Richmond (Yorks)

2010 General Election, Richmond (Yorks)

1997 Conservative Party leadership election

United Kingdom general election, 2001

 

|}

All parties with more than 500 votes shown.

References

Hague, William
Hague, William